The 47th Annual TV Week Logie Awards was held on Sunday 1 May 2005 at the Crown Palladium in Melbourne, and broadcast on the Nine Network. In an historic first, the ceremony was hosted by Eddie McGuire, Andrew O'Keefe and Rove McManus. Special guests included Kathryn Morris and Adam Rodríguez.

Winners and nominees
In the tables below, winners are listed first and highlighted in bold.

Gold Logie

Acting/Presenting

Most Popular Programs

Most Outstanding Programs

Performers
Mario
The cast of Neighbours
The cast of Grease: The Arena Spectacular
Il Divo
Michael Bublé

Hall of Fame
After 20 years on Australian television, Neighbours became the 22nd inductee into the TV Week Logies Hall of Fame.

References

External links
 

2005
2005 television awards
2005 in Australian television
2005 awards in Australia